The Belgian National Badminton Championships is a tournament organized by the Belgian Badminton Federation to crown the best badminton players in Belgium. They are held since the season 1948/1949. In the initial years all five disciplines were not always played.

There is an international tournament in Belgium, the Belgian International, held since the season 1958/1959.

Past winners

National Junior Champions

References
Belgium

Badminton tournaments in Belgium
National badminton championships
Recurring sporting events established in 1948
Badminton
1948 establishments in Belgium